James Weaver (born 4 March 1955 in London) is a British former racing driver.

In 1978 Weaver started racing in Formula Ford with Scorpion Racing School. He then began his professional career in the European F3. In 1982 he was the Eddie Jordan Racing team's primary driver, but in 1983 he returned to the European F3. He debuted in the British Touring Car Championship in 1989 at the Oulton Park circuit in March that year. He finished second overall in the British Touring Car Championship that year behind the winner John Cleland. He won Class B that year.

In 1987, Weaver joined Dyson Racing, for whom he drove for twenty years. He resulted IMSA GT Championship runner-up in 1995, won the 1998 United States Road Racing Championship and the 2000 and 2001 Rolex Sports Car Series, and collected two vice-championships in the 2004 and 2006 American Le Mans Series.

Among his wins, he triumphed at the 1997 24 Hours of Daytona and the 1997, 2000 and 2002 6 Hours of Watkins Glen. He also finished second at the 1985 24 Hours of Le Mans and the 1999 12 Hours of Sebring.

Weaver officially retired after the 2006 American Le Mans Series season.

Racing record

Complete British Saloon / Touring Car Championship results
(key) (Races in bold indicate pole position – 1984–1990 in class) (Races in italics indicate fastest lap – 1 point awarded ?–1989 in class)

‡ Endurance driver.

American Open-Wheel racing results
(key)

PPG Indycar Series
(key) (Races in bold indicate pole position)

24 Hours of Le Mans results

Sources
 http://www.theracesite.com/index.cfm?template=magazine&mag_id=12685

1955 births
English racing drivers
Living people
British Touring Car Championship drivers
BRDC Gold Star winners
Indy Lights drivers
Champ Car drivers
International Formula 3000 drivers
24 Hours of Le Mans drivers
24 Hours of Daytona drivers
American Le Mans Series drivers
Sportspeople from London
World Sportscar Championship drivers
Nismo drivers
David Price Racing drivers
Mercedes-AMG Motorsport drivers
Audi Sport drivers
BMW M drivers
Porsche Motorsports drivers
Sauber Motorsport drivers